Dariusz Kulesza (born 28 August 1987) is a Polish short track speed skater. He competed in three events at the 2006 Winter Olympics.

References

1987 births
Living people
Polish male short track speed skaters
Olympic short track speed skaters of Poland
Short track speed skaters at the 2006 Winter Olympics
Sportspeople from Białystok